Truman State University (TSU or Truman) is a public university in Kirksville, Missouri. It had 4,225 enrolled students in the fall of 2021 pursuing degrees in 52 undergraduate and 11 graduate programs.

The university is named for U.S. President Harry Truman, who was a Missouri native. From 1972 until 1996, the school was known as Northeast Missouri State University.

History 

Truman State University was founded in 1867 by Joseph Baldwin as the North Missouri Normal School and Commercial College. Baldwin was a pioneer in education, and his school quickly gained official recognition in 1870 by the Missouri General Assembly, which designated it as the First District Normal School, the first public teachers' college in Missouri.

The school served a district comprising 26 counties: including Adair, Audrain, Boone, Callaway, Chariton, Clark, Howard, Knox, Lewis, Lincoln, Linn, Marion, Macon, Monroe, Montgomery, Pike, Putnam, Ralls, Randolph, St. Charles, Schuyler, Scotland, Shelby, Sullivan, and Warren.

Purple and white were adopted as the school's official colors after Basil Brewer wrote a school song entitled "The Purple and the White." They have remained as the school colors since.

In 1919, the school was renamed Northeast Missouri State Teachers College. For the next four decades, it was commonly called Kirksville State.

In 1924, a fire destroyed old Baldwin Hall and the library. The lake that once filled the current quadrangle, or "The Quad" (a prominent feature in pre-1924 photographs), was pumped dry in a futile attempt to douse the fire. The Quad now serves as a popular gathering place where students study, play games, hold events, such as small concerts and fairs, and meet with one another.

The school's mission broadened significantly over the years, and by the 1960s, it was no longer simply a teacher-training school. Reflecting this, it was renamed Northeast Missouri State College in 1968.

Only four years later, in 1972, it was renamed Northeast Missouri State University (NMSU). On June 20, 1985, Governor John Ashcroft signed legislation designating the university as Missouri's only statewide public liberal arts and sciences university. This changed the school's focus from regional to statewide. As such, nearly 100 programs were dropped in the span of six years, including all two-year programs that did not fulfill the liberal arts mission.

By the 1990s, the university boasted a nationally known accounting division and schools of science, mathematics, computer science, and literature. Coinciding with the 10th anniversary of the university's mission change, Governor Mel Carnahan signed legislation changing its name to Truman State University. The new name became official on July 1, 1996, and the university remains designated by statute as Missouri's premier public liberal arts and sciences institution.

In the 2016 U.S. News & World Report College Rankings, Truman placed eighth in the Midwest among regional universities.

Presidents 
 Joseph Baldwin (1867–81)
 William P. Nason (1881–82)
 Joseph Blanton (1882–91)
 William D. Dobson (1891–99)
 John R. Kirk (1899–1925)
 Eugene Fair (1925–37)
 Walter H. Ryle (1937–67)
 F. Clark Elkins (1967–69)
 Eli F. Mittler (1969–70)
 Charles J. McClain (1970–89)
 Robert A. Dager (1989–90)
 Russell G. Warren (1990–94)
 W. Jack Magruder (1994–2003)
 Barbara Dixon (2003–08)
 Darrell Krueger (2008–10)
 Troy Paino (2010–16)
 Susan L. Thomas (2016–present)

Board of Governors 
Truman's Board of Governors consists of ten members. Each member is appointed by the Governor of Missouri to serve a four-year term, with a student representative serving for two years. The ten members must meet residential requirements defined by Missouri law. The Board of Governors also includes four committees: the Finance and Audit Committee, the Budget and Capital Projects Committee, the Honorary Degrees Committee, and the Truman State University Foundation Board of Directors.

Campus 

The campus is located on the south side of Kirksville. Truman's main campus is situated around a slightly wooded quadrangle, also known as the "Quad." It is two blocks south of the town square, which includes an eight-screen movie theatre and various eateries and shops.

Notable buildings on campus include Pickler Memorial Library, the Kirk Memorial, the Kirk Building, Magruder Hall, McClain Hall, Baldwin Hall, Violette Hall, Barnett Hall, Ophelia Parrish, Pershing Arena, the Student Union Building and the Recreation Center ("The Rec"). The oldest building is not Kirk Building, but is instead the purple-doored Physical Plant building located between the Health Services building and Magruder Hall.

Pickler Memorial Library was named after Samuel M. Pickler, who donated funds to rebuild the library after it was destroyed by fire in 1924. Renovated in 1993, it now houses the main computer lab, as well as approximately 500,000 volumes of various works. The front lobby area of Pickler Memorial Library is known as "the Bubble" for its curved glass atrium.

Kirk Memorial is a small, domed structure near the center of campus. The structure is dedicated to John Kirk, the fifth president of the university. It formerly housed Truman's debate team and now houses a few administrative offices. The Kirk Building was once the university's combined gymnasium and auditorium facility. It previously housed the Center for International Education, Student Affairs, Publications and the Department of Sports Information, but has been closed since Fall 2020 and is currently used for storage space. Beginning in Summer 2022, the building will undergo a $21 million repair and become a new student and community success center, with a projected completion date of Winter 2024. 

The Rec is located north of Centennial Hall and is open every day except on holidays. It also offers a gymnasium for a variety of sports, a weight room, an elevated track, various exercise equipment, and a small multipurpose gym for hockey, indoor soccer, and other indoor sports. 

There are seven main academic buildings. Magruder Hall is the science building and houses the departments of Chemistry, Physics, Biology, and Agriculture. McClain Hall serves as both an administrative and academic building. For the academic portion, Classical & Modern Languages, Economics, English & Linguistics, History, Philosophy & Religion, and Political Science can be found there. Baldwin Hall is connected to McClain Hall and houses the campus auditorium that is best known for hosting cultural events through the Kohlenberg-Lyceum Series. Violette Hall, named after former history professor E.M. Violette, is home to the School of Business, the Mathematics and Computer Science Department, and the Education Department. Ophelia Parrish (OP) is home to the Art, Music, and Theatre Departments; it is named after Ms. Ophelia Parrish (1850-1915), the college's first librarian. Barnett Hall is home to the departments of Anthropology, Geography, and Sociology; Communication; Justice Systems; Psychology; ROTC; and Nursing programs. Finally, the Pershing Building, also home to the basketball team's Pershing Arena, houses the Departments of Health and Exercise Science and Communication Disorders.

Services available on campus to students include the student health center, career center, and writing center. The health center is closed on the weekends and holidays. The career center is located on the first floor of the Student Union Building and provides help to students in determining a career path, selecting a major, developing career skills, helping put together a resume, or even conducting mock interviews. The writing center is located on the first floor of the Library and offers critique and editing for student papers.

Academics

Admissions 
Admission to the university is based upon a holistic review of a candidate's academic record, with the strongest consideration being given to those who have a combined ability score of 140 or higher. The combined ability score is calculated by adding the percentage of students in the applicant's graduating class that the applicant outranks and the percentage of students the applicant outscored on a nationally standardized test (usually the ACT, although the SAT is also accepted). Admissions decisions are also based, however, on a mandatory application essay, the applicant's resume, and the applicant's high school and extracurricular record. According to the Princeton Review, Truman has a selectivity rating of 88, a 68% acceptance rate, with applicants having a 3.79 average high school GPA, and an 88% retention rate after freshman year. All applicants must have 4 credits of English, 3 credits of math, 3 credits of science, 2 credits of foreign language, 2 credits of social studies, and 1 credit of fine art. The average GPA of an admitted student is 3.25 on a 4.0 scale, with 50% of all admitted students ranking in the top 10% of their class, and the median ACT range is 25–31.

The Liberal Studies program 
On July 20, 1985, the state of Missouri charged Truman State University with serving as the state's public liberal arts and sciences university. In order to meet this commitment to the people of Missouri, the Truman faculty and administration created the Liberal Studies Program, the general education curriculum undergraduates complete in order to receive a Truman degree. The Liberal Studies Program consists of three distinct areas:

Essential Skills for success in liberal studies, including courses in writing as critical thinking, public speaking, elementary functions, statistics, computer literacy, and personal well-being.
Modes of Inquiry by which students may approach problems and issues in other academic areas. The eight modes in the Modes of Inquiry have been separated into two separate areas Qualitative and Quantitative, each representing four academic areas.  Students must complete coursework in three of the four academic areas in each category: fine arts, literature, history, and philosophy/religion are based on the Qualitative Modes while mathematics, life science, physical science, and social science are under the Quantitative Modes.
Interconnecting Perspectives that allow students to understand and appreciate better the knowledge they have gained. This includes taking a series of writing-enhanced courses, an interdisciplinary seminar course in the junior year, at least two semesters of a foreign language, and participating in an intercultural experience (this can be fulfilled through any one of a series of courses or by going on any study abroad trip).

Schools 

The School of Arts and Letters is the home of the departments of Art, Classical & Modern Languages, English & Linguistics, Music, and Theatre. Degrees offered through the school include Art, Art History, Classics, English, French, German, Linguistics, Music, Romance Languages, Russian, Spanish, Theatre, and Visual Communications. In addition to the 17 distinct undergraduate majors offered, the school also offers 6 graduate programs, including Music and English.

The School of Business offers degrees in Business Administration (BA or BS) with an emphasis in Finance, Management, Marketing, and International Business (BA only). In addition, a BS and MAcc in Accounting are offered, with the graduate program ranked third in the nation in terms of CPA passage rates. The School of Business is also AACSB accredited.

The School of Health Sciences & Education offers degrees in communication disorders (graduate and undergraduate), nursing, health science, exercise science, and education (MAE only). Education students can specialize in elementary education, special education, English, exercise science, foreign language, music, mathematics, science, and visual arts.

The School of Science and Mathematics offers degrees in agricultural science, biology, chemistry, mathematics, computer science, and physics. The school also offers Missouri's only undergraduate interdisciplinary degree program in mathematical biology which has connections and resources available through the Intercollegiate Biomathematics Alliance. The school also coordinates the Missouri Pre-STEM Pathways Program with Moberly Area Community College, Metropolitan Community College - Kansas City, and St. Charles Community College.

The School of Social & Cultural Studies offers degrees in communication, Economics, History, Justice Systems, Military Science (minor only), Philosophy & Religion, Political Science, Psychology, Geography (minor only), and Sociology/Anthropology.

Students are also free to create their own interdisciplinary majors or to minor in any of the approved interdisciplinary minors, which include African/African-American Studies, Asian Studies, Classical Studies, Cognitive Sciences, Disability Studies, Environmental Studies, Folklore, Forensic Science, International Studies, Italian Studies, Mathematical Biology, Medieval Studies and Women's and Gender Studies.

Campus life

Residence life

In the 1960s, the university built Dobson Hall (1961), Ryle Hall (1963), Missouri Hall (1965), and Centennial Hall (1967). There are three other residence halls on campus:  Blanton-Nason-Brewer (1948, Brewer added in 1959), Ezra C. Grim Hall (1923), and West Campus Suites (2006). The residence halls are maintained by Residence Life, an administrative body of professionals and students who live in the halls and act as student advisors (SAs) and hall directors. Truman's residence halls underwent a $90 million renovation schedule in 2000s and 2010s. This project included the construction of West Campus Suites in 2006, the renovation of Missouri Hall in 2006, Blanton-Nason-Brewer in 2007, and Dobson in 2008. Ryle Hall's two-year renovation concluded in the summer of 2011, and Centennial underwent a two-year renovation concluding in 2014.

Dobson Hall is coed by wing and houses roughly 400 students. Dobson Hall closed for the 2019–20 academic year but reopened one floor in the 2020-21 and 2021-22 years, with plans to reopen the second floor in 2022-23.

Ryle Hall is the second largest hall at Truman. This coed residence hall houses nearly 600 students in suite-style rooms.

Centennial Hall is the largest residence hall on campus. This coed hall houses nearly 600 students in suite-style rooms.  Centennial Hall will be closed for the 2022-23 and 2023-24 academic years to undergo renovations, particularly to its windows.

Missouri Hall is a coed residence hall that houses 518 students, making it the third largest on campus. Missouri Hall is made up of seven different wings. On both the north and south sides of the building three wings join with a common lounge. The two common lounges are linked by a seventh "crossover" wing. From overhead, the building is shaped like an elongated asterisk.  

Blanton-Nason-Brewer offers three floors of suite-style, coed living arrangements to students. Originally three separate buildings connected by breezeways, the building underwent a major renovation in the 2007–2008 academic year and is now one, unified residence hall. 

West Campus Suites, just northwest of Centennial Hall, opened its doors to 416 students in Fall 2006. Currently, all floors are coed by suite. 

Truman also offers the Campbell Apartments for student living. Campbell is located next to the tennis courts just east of Stokes Stadium. Yet another option is Farm Hall, located at the University Farm. Only four students, often majors in agricultural science, live on the farm each year. Their work on the farm helps them gain useful first-hand experience, as well as help pay for room and board.

Student organizations 

All students are encouraged to explore their particular interests and find quality, co-curricular experiences to participate in. Truman offers approximately 250 different student organizations in the following areas:

  Academic/Professional
  Campus Media
  Cultural
  Fee-Based
  Fine Arts
  Greek
  Health and Wellness
  Honorary
  Political
  Recreational/Sports
  Religious
  Residence Life
  Service
  Special Interest
  University Department

An organization that has garnered considerable attention since its inception is the Bulldog Student Investment Fund, a group in which student analysts invest a portion of the university's endowment in public equities (stocks) in an effort to outperform the market. The organization hopes to eventually use the proceeds from the fund's returns to sponsor scholarships for Truman students. In 2015, members from the Bulldog Student Investment fund, representing Truman State, achieved the first place prize among the five competing universities in the St. Louis CFA Institute Challenge and went on to compete at nationals.

Greek life 

Approximately 20% of the student body is affiliated with a social Greek organization. Truman hosts nine sororities and fifteen fraternities. 

Interfraternity Council (IFC) 
IFC governs the twelve men's social fraternities on campus:

Alpha Gamma Rho
Alpha Kappa Lambda
Beta Theta Pi
Delta Chi
Lambda Chi Alpha
Phi Kappa Tau
Phi Lambda Phi (Local)
Phi Sigma Kappa
Pi Kappa Phi
Sigma Tau Gamma
Sigma Phi Epsilon
Tau Kappa Epsilon

Panhellenic Council 
The sororities are governed by the Panhellenic Council, which is made up of six internationally recognized social sororities on campus:
Alpha Gamma Delta
Alpha Sigma Alpha
Delta Phi Epsilon
Delta Zeta
Sigma Kappa
Sigma Sigma Sigma

National Pan-Hellenic Council 
There are also four of the "Divine Nine" National Pan-Hellenic Council historically black fraternities and sororities:
Kappa Alpha Psi fraternity
Phi Beta Sigma fraternity
Delta Sigma Theta sorority
Sigma Gamma Rho sorority

Multicultural
Sigma Lambda Gamma sorority
Sigma Lambda Beta fraternity

The organizations do service around the community, provide leadership on campus, and provide a social outlet for students.

Professional fraternities 
At Truman, students may choose to affiliate with a professional fraternity associated with their academic interests or intended major. Professional fraternities often admit both women and men, but there are some exceptions (noted below).

Alpha Chi Sigma
Alpha Kappa Psi
Alpha Gamma Rho
Delta Sigma Pi
Phi Epsilon Kappa
Phi Mu Alpha (men only)

Honorary organizations 
Truman also offers a wide selection of honorary organizations.

Alpha Phi Sigma
Alpha Psi Omega
Alpha Sigma Gamma*
Blue Key Honor Society
Cardinal Key Honor Society
Eta Sigma Phi
Eta Sigma Gamma
Kappa Delta Pi
Kappa Mu Epsilon
Lambda Pi Eta
National Residence Hall Honorary
National Society of Collegiate Scholars
Omicron Delta Kappa
Phi Alpha Theta
Phi Beta Kappa
Phi Kappa Phi
Phi Sigma Pi
Pi Delta Phi
Psi Chi
Sigma Delta Pi
Sigma Tau Delta
Tau Lambda Sigma
Pershing Society - An organization for students awarded the Pershing Scholarship, the university's most prestigious award.

Campus lore 

The weather vane atop Kirk Memorial is welded in place so that it will always point northeast, in honor of the school's previous name and its location.
Students traditionally stuck their chewing gum on a redbud tree on the east side of campus. This "gum tree" was decorated in colorful wads, and at times, it even sported students' names.  Lore has it that the concept of the gum tree originated in the 1920s when it was against the rules to chew gum in class. The tree was vandalized and knocked down by an unknown party in 2000, but students quickly adopted another tree.
The annual football game against Northwest Missouri State University was established in 1930 when Northwest president Uel W. Lamkin sent Fair a polished hickory stick from the farm where the former president Eugene Fair was born. The "Hickory Stick" was contested annually until 2013, when Truman and Northwest Missouri began competing in different athletic conferences.

Army ROTC 
Army Reserve Officers' Training Corps (Army ROTC) was established at Truman in 1969. Approximately, 200 Truman students are members of the "Bulldog Battalion" and enroll in military science courses each semester. Students completing the ROTC program are additionally awarded a minor in Military Science.

Athletics

Truman is a member of NCAA Division II and plays in the Great Lakes Valley Conference (GLVC), joining the conference in 2013 after having been a member of the Mid-America Intercollegiate Athletics Association (MIAA) since that league's creation in 1912. Because the GLVC did not sponsor wrestling until the 2016–17 season, that team remained in the MIAA.

The athletic department sponsors 18 teams, ten each for men and women. Among Truman's most recent successes include: four regional championships for women's volleyball, a regional berth for men's basketball in 2006, a College World Series appearance for baseball, and undefeated regular seasons for both men's and women's soccer. The women's swim team won six consecutive NCAA Women's Swimming and Diving Championships national titles for Division II between 2001 and 2006 and won again in 2008  again beating their in state rival Drury University.

See also
 Truman State University Press

Notable alumni and faculty

References

External links 

 
 Truman State Athletics website

 
Educational institutions established in 1867
Education in Adair County, Missouri
Buildings and structures in Adair County, Missouri
1867 establishments in Missouri
Public universities and colleges in Missouri
Public liberal arts colleges in the United States